is a passenger railway station  located in the city of Amagasaki, Hyōgo Prefecture, Japan. It is operated by the West Japan Railway Company (JR West).

Lines

Station layout
The station consists of two ground-level opposed side platforms serving two tracks, connected by an elevated station building. The station has a staffed ticket office.

Platforms

History
Inadera Station opened on 1 April 1944. With the privatization of the Japan National Railways (JNR) on 1 April 1987, the station came under the aegis of the West Japan Railway Company.

Station numbering was introduced in March 2018 with Inadera being assigned station number JR-G51.

Passenger statistics
In fiscal 2016, the station was used by an average of 9008 passengers daily

Surrounding area
Gunze Town Center Tsukashin
Kewpie Itami Plant
Hyogo Prefectural Amagasaki Inaen High School
Otemae University Itami Inano Campus

See also
List of railway stations in Japan

References

External links 

  Inadera Station from JR-Odekake.net 

Railway stations in Hyōgo Prefecture
Railway stations in Japan opened in 1981
Amagasaki